Tihar Village is one of the oldest villages in Delhi. Tihar village was established by Muslims Tyagi in the 17th century.

References

Villages in West Delhi district